The women's pole vault event at the 2007 Summer Universiade was held on 9–10 August.

Medalists

Results

Qualification

Final

References
Results
Final results

Pole
2007 in women's athletics
2007